The canton of Lot et Truyère is an administrative division of the Aveyron department, southern France. It was created at the French canton reorganisation which came into effect in March 2015. Its seat is in Espalion.

It consists of the following communes:
 
Bessuéjouls
Campuac
Le Cayrol
Coubisou
Entraygues-sur-Truyère
Espalion
Espeyrac
Estaing
Le Fel
Golinhac
Le Nayrac
Saint-Hippolyte
Sébrazac
Villecomtal

References

Cantons of Aveyron